Sturts Meadows Station, most commonly known as Sturts Meadows, is a pastoral lease that has operated as a cattle station and a sheep station in outback New South Wales.

The station was established by Abraham and Matilda Wallace in 1863, the name given to the property was taken from Charles Sturt whose expedition travelled farther to the west. The Wallaces travelled to the station from Mingarie in South Australia with 25 horses and 1,400 sheep via the Barrier Range in 1864, squatting at different water holes. Lack of water drove them further north and they didn't return to the area until 1868 only to find that Joseph Panton had moved onto the property and named it Sturts Meadows. In 1869 the property was transferred to Abraham Wallace, but a continued lack of water meant the Wallaces stayed on the move.

Wallace embarked on a trek from Sturts Meadow in January 1880 heading north to the properties he had acquired leases to in the Northern Territory along the Roper River in 1879. The property was later named Elsey Station and Wallace left the next day to return to Sturts Meadows.

By 1882 the station shore 32,000 sheep, and by 1883 the owners had spent £24,080 on improvements.

Wallace retired in 1884 and appointed a manager to run the property.

Sackville Kidman, the brother and business partner of Sidney Kidman, once worked at Sturts Meadow as the station manager until silver was discovered at the Barrier Range and he started a butchering business in Silverton. Kidman acquired the property some time prior to 1924 and was making plans to build up a flock of 100,000 sheep across his properties in the area including Sturts, Morden, Longawirra and Corona Stations. By 1924 the area was being plagued by dingos, Sturts Meadows had been carrying flocks of up to 100,000 sheep but since the pest arrived numbers had dropped substantially.

The property was on the market again in 1928 when the trustees of the late W.H. Williams put the property up for auction. A stone house with seven rooms, men's quarters and a ten stand shearing shed were among the improvements. The homestead well had 16 tanks and could water 7,000 sheep and the land was described as being made up of grasslands and salt bush country.

Bijerkerno Gorge, where Eight Mile Creek breaks through the Barrier Ranges, is situated on the property. In 2004 the owner, Peter Beven, fenced off a  section around the gorge as part of an effort to protect the environmentally sensitive area.

See also
List of ranches and stations

References

Stations (Australian agriculture)
Pastoral leases in New South Wales
1863 establishments in Australia
Far West (New South Wales)